Democratiya was a free quarterly online review of books that aims "stimulate discussion of radical democratic political theory". Sixteen editions were produced from 2005 until a final edition in Autumn 2009. Democratiya merged with Dissent magazine.

Democratiya's founding editor was Alan Johnson, a professor in the Department of Social and Psychological Sciences at Edge Hill University in Lancashire, England, and a co-author of the Euston Manifesto.

Democratiya’s topics have ranged over many issues, including those relating to war, human rights, the United Nations, democracy, and the international community.

Books
Global Politics After 9/11: The Democratiya Interviews, Published by The Foreign Policy Centre and Democratiya (London) Edited by Alan Johnson, with preface by Michael Walzer ; This book collects together conversations about the dilemmas of progressive foreign policy after 9/11 published in Democratiya.  (Interviews with Paul Berman, Ladan Boroumand, Jean Bethke Elshtain, David Held, Saad Eddin Ibrahim, Mary Kaldor, Kanan Makiya, Joshua Muravchik, Martin Shaw, Anne-Marie Slaughter)

Articles

References

External links
 Democratiya archives on the Dissent website

Book review magazines
Quarterly magazines published in the United Kingdom
Defunct literary magazines published in the United Kingdom
Defunct political magazines published in the United Kingdom
Free magazines
Magazines established in 2005
Magazines disestablished in 2009